Vennira Aadai Moorthy (born 25 July 1936) is an Indian actor and comedian in Tamil cinema. He has starred in many Tamil films and television serials as a comedian and also played supporting roles. He is a lawyer by education, and holds a B.L. degree in addition to a PhD in astrology. He is married to actress Manimala who played Suhasini's mother in Sindhu Bhairavi and the heroine in Vallavanukku Vallavan (1965). He is also a well known script-writer. Kamal Haasan's first full-fledged film as hero Maalai Sooda Vaa, had Murthy as a script writer.

He is especially remembered for his Sunday TV Show 'Meendum Meendum Sirippu', which aired on Sun TV for 11 years. The show had a comical take on common household themes involving slapstick and wordplay, usually ending with a social message. Moorthy wrote much of the material himself, in addition to starring on the show. He has Also written 11 books off which 1 in English and 10 in Tamil which includes "Super market" "Jokes Dairy" and "Nambamudiyadha Nambikkaigal" are noted few.

Early life 
Moorthy was born on 25 July 1936 in British India. He is the youngest of seven children of Parents Chidambaram K. R. Nataraja Sastri, Thiruvaduthurai Sivakami The Father a criminal lawyer. He sought to follow in his father's footsteps and studied law, but ultimately never became a lawyer. After completing his BL, he obtained employment as a sales representative of Remington Rand. Moorthy left the job because it involved excess touring, and struggled to find a new job.
He had a brief stint at AMJain college, Meenambakkam Chennai as tutor in department of English. He taught Shakespeare plays in 1959–1960.

Career 
After leaving Remington Rand, Moorthy met his friend Chakravarthy, an associate of filmmaker C. V. Sridhar, and told him about his desire to act. Chakravarthy, who had previously seen Moorthy act on stage, told Sridhar about him, and Moorthy made his film debut in Vennira Aadai (1965). It was after the success of this film that he came to be known as Vennira Aadai Moorthy.

Selected filmography 

 Vennira Aadai (1965)
 Thenmazhai (1966)
 Kadhal Paduthum Paadu 
 Anjal Petti 520 (1969)
 Sivantha Mann 
 Naangu Killadigal 
 Irulum Oliyum (1971)
 Muhammad bin Tughluq 
 Uttharavindri Ulle Vaa 
 Kasethan Kadavulada (1972)
 Ponvandu (1973)
 Engamma Sapatham (1974)
 Athaiya Mamiya 
 Paatha Poojai 
Anbe Aaruyire  (1975)
 Annakili (1976)
 Vazhvu En Pakkam 
 Kalamadi Kalam (1977)
 Gayathri (1978)
 Chittu Kuruvi 
 Mullum Malarum 
 Sakka Podu Podu Raja
 Kuppathu Raja (1979)
 Enippadigal 
 Azhiyatha Kolangal 
 Jamboo (1980)
 Ullasa Paravaigal 
 Neerottam
 Kannil Theriyum Kathaikal
 Bala Nagamma (1981)
 Kanni Theevu 
 Nandu 
 Panneer Pushpangal
 Sivappu Malli
 Sankarlal
 Kaathula Poo
 Keezh Vaanam Sivakkum
 Raja Enga Raja (1982)
 Deviyin Thiruvilaiyadal
 Thaniyatha Thagam
 Azhagiya Kanne
 Thanikattu Raja
 Sinna Mapplai (1993)
 Sangili
 Theerpugal Thiruththapadalam
 Theeratha Vilaiyattu Pillai
 Nadamadum Silaigal
 Iniyavale Vaa
 Paritchaikku Neramaachu
 Uruvangal Maralam (1983)
 Nenjamellam Neeye
 Sivappu Sooriyan
 Dowry Kalyanam
 Ilamai Kaalangal
 Antha Sila Naatkal
 Uyirullavarai Usha
 Thambathigal
 Saatchi
 Thandikkappatta Niyayangal
 Manaivi Solle Manthiram
 Thangaikkor Geetham
 Madurai Sooran (1984)
 Theerpu En Kaiyil
 Kathula Poo
 Vetri
 Vengaiyin Maindhan
 Maaman Machaan
 Veetuku Oru Kannagi
 Sanga Natham
 Sankari
 Iru Medhaigal
 Kudumbam
 Nalla Thambi (1985)
 Kanni Rasi
 Pudhu Yugam
 Navagraha Nayagi
 Raman Sreeraman
 Naan Sigappu Manithan
 Irandu Manam
 Veettukkari
 Engal Kural
 Urimai
 Sri Raghavendra
 Unakkaga Oru Roja
 Raja Rishi
 Neethiyin Marupakkam
 Samaya Purathale Satchi
 Paadum Vaanampaadi
 Anandha Kanneer (1986)
 Kulirkaala Megangal
 Cinema Cinema
 Muthal Vasantham
 Manithanin Marupakkam
 Mythili Ennai Kaathali
 Paaru Paaru Pattinam Paaru
 Oru Iniya Udhayam
 Sirai Paravai (1987)
 Paadu Nilave
 Anand
 Jallikattu
 Enga Ooru Pattukaran
 Enga Veetu Ramayanam
 Kalyana Kacheri
 Theertha Karaiyinile
 Mupperum Deviyar
 Shenbagame Shenbagame (1988)
 Manamagale Vaa
 Annanagar Mudhal Theru
 Kaalaiyum Neeye Maalaiyum Neeye
 Sakkarai Panthal
 Solla Thudikuthu Manasu
 Therkathi Kallan
 Rendum Rendum Anchu
 Paatti Sollai Thattathe
 Soora Samhaaram
 En Purushanthaan Enakku Mattumthaan (1989)
 Sattathin Thirappu Vizhaa
 Thangamani Rangamani
 Pudhea Paadhai
 Avathellam Pennalae
 Moodu Manthiram
 Dharma Devan
 Thangamana Purushan
 Thangamani Rangamani
 Annanukku Jai
 Kai Veesamma Kai Veesu
 Poruthathu Pothum
 Raaja Raajathan
 Sattathin Marupakkam
 Bandhuvulostunnaru Jagratha
 Kavalukku Kettikaran (1990)
 Idhaya Thamarai
 Kavalukku Kettikaran
 Aadi Velli
 Salem Vishnu
 Vedikkai En Vadikkai
 Nila Pennae
 Enkitta Mothathe
 Mallu Vetti Minor
 Michael Madana Kama Rajan
 Nadigan
 Ethir Kaatru
 Michael Madhana Kamarajan
 Vaaliba Viliyattu
 Aatha Naan Pass Ayittaen
 Eeramana Rojave (1991)
 Thangamana Thangachi
 Nanbargal
 Sendhoora Devi
 Shanti Enathu Shanti
 Pondatti Pondattithan
 Veetla Ezhi Velila Puli
 Kizhakku Karai
 Moondrezhuthil En Moochirukkum
 Kurumbukkaran
 Thayamma
 Idhu Namma Bhoomi
 Rickshaw Mama (1992)
 Senbaga Thottam
 Thangarasu
 Singaravelan
 Sevagan
 Brahmachari
 Annan Ennada Thambi Ennada
 Sathiyam Adhu Nichayam
 Meera
 Mutrugai (1993)
 Maamiyar Veedu
 Pettredutha Pillai
 Minmini Poochigal
 Prathap
 Ulle Veliye
 Rajadhi Raja Raja Kulothunga Raja Marthanda Raja Gambeera Kathavaraya Krishna Kamarajan
 Pass Mark
 Athma
 Poranthalum Aambalaya Porakka Kudathu
 Pondatti Pondattithan
 Maravan
 Karuppu Vellai
 Karpagam Vanthachu
 Enga Muthalali
 Paarambariyam
 Mogha Mull (1994)
 Kaviyam
 Vaanga Partner Vaanga
 Chinna Pulla
 Sevvanthi
 Sathyavan
 Sevatha Ponnu
 En Rajangam
 Priyanka
 Pathavi Pramanam
 Pondattiye Deivam
 Killadi Mappillai
 Manasu Rendum Pudhusu
 Atha Maga Rathiname
 Mappillai Manasu Poopola
 Vaa Magale Vaa
 Aval Pottakolam (1995)
 Valli Vara Pora
 Manathile Oru Paattu
 Raja Enga Raja
 Aanazhagan
 Thai Thangai Paasam
 Mogamul
 Avatharam
 Rajavin Parvaiyile
 Nadodi Mannan
 Santhaikku Vanthakkili
 Udhavum Karangal
 Neela Kuyil
 Varraar Sandiyar
 Love Birds (1996)
 Irattai Roja
 Mappillai Manasu Poopola
 Kaalam Maari Pochu
 Enakkoru Magan Pirappan
 Tata Birla
 Andha Naal
 Mr. Romeo
 Gopala Gopala
 Purushan Pondatti
 Kaalamellam Kadhal Vaazhga (1997)
 Nalla Manasukkaran
 Thaali Pudhusu
 Pongalo Pongal
 Kalyana Vaibhogam
 Thedinen Vanthathu
 Periya Manushan
 Veerapandi Kottayiley
 Color Kanavugal (1998)
 Ponnu Velayira Bhoomi
 Rathna
 Aval Varuvala
 Golmaal
 Poonthottam
 Thaayin Manikodi
 Ponmaanai Thedi
 Sivappu Nila
 Adutha Kattam (1999)
 Mugam
 Pudhu Kudithanam
 Thirupathi Ezhumalai Venkatesa
 Thai Poranthachu (2000)
 Athey Manithan
 Kandha Kadamba Kathir Vela
 Magalirkkaga
 Nageswari (2001)
 Thaalikaatha Kaaliamman
 Sigamani Ramamani
 Sonnal Thaan Kaadhala
 Krishna Krishna
 Kunguma Pottu Gounder
 Viswanathan Ramamoorthy
 Vedham
 Chocolate
 Kottai Mariamman
 Gounder Veetu Maapillai (2002)
 Karpooranayagi
 Ezhumalai
 Shree
 I Love You Da
 Annai Kaligambal (2003)
 Ramachandra
 Yes Madam
 Well Done
 Saamy
 Parasuram
 Galatta Ganapathy
 Anbe Un Vasam
 Alai
 Jairam (2004)
 Madhurey
 M. Kumaran Son Of Mahalakshmi
 Kadhale Jayam
 Kochi Rajavu (Malayalam)
 Veeranna (2005)
 Prathi Gnayiru 9.30 to 10.00
 Kaatrullavarai
 Ponniyin Selvan
 Alaiyadikkuthu
 Vanakkam Thalaiva
 Madrasi (2006)
 Imsai Arasan 23rd Pulikecei
 Kaivantha Kalai
 Kurukshetram
 Vathiyar
 Kumaran
 Madhurai Veeran (2007)
 18 Vayasu Puyale
 Yaaruku Yaaro
 Thavam
 Dindigul Sarathy (2008)
 Unnai Naan
 Durai
 Jaganmohini (2009)
 Anthony Yaar
 Sivagiri
 Oru Kadhalan Oru Kadhali
 Thamizh Padam (2010)
 Sura
 Rasikkum Seemane
 Ochayee
 Vallakottai
 Sagakkal (2011)
 Vaaliban Sutrum Ulagam
 Thambi Vettothi Sundaram
 Maharaja
 Manam Kothi Paravai (2012)
 Summa Nachunu Irukku (2013)
 Arya Surya
 Pani Vizhum Nilavu (2014)
 Killadi (2015)
 Sandamarutham
 Rombha Nallavan Da Nee
 Vasuvum Saravananum Onna Padichavanga (2015)
 Itly (2018)

TV serials 
Meendum Meendum Sirippu (Sun TV)

References

External links 
 

Living people
Tamil male actors
Indian male film actors
Tamil comedians
1936 births
Indian male comedians
Male actors from Tamil Nadu
People from Cuddalore district
20th-century Indian male actors